Thomas McCall (1834–1904) was a Scottish cartwright.

Biography 

McCall was born in Penpont, he came to Kilmarnock at age 20, where he lived until his death (obituary 1904).

He built, in 1869, two versions of a two-wheeled velocipede with levers and rods tossing a crank on the rear wheel (English Mechanic 5/14/1869 and 6/11/1869). This was a reaction to the French velocipedes, of the mid-1860s, with their front-wheel pedal cranks. In fact, this rear-wheel idea occupied seven more inventors in that year (Lessing 1991).

When in the 1880s a rich corn-trader named James Johnston started a campaign to attribute the "first true" bicycle to his uncle Kirkpatrick MacMillan and his native country of Dumfries in general, he attributed the McCall designs to MacMillan and dated them as of 1839. Skeptics allege that the reason McCall built a replica of his machines to be exhibited as MacMillan's at the 1896 Stanley Show, at the behest of Johnston, can only be a need of money (Clayton 1987). That alleged replica is now at Dumfries Observatory.

See also
History of the bicycle
Treadle bicycle

Further reading

N. Clayton: The First Bicycle, in: The Boneshaker #113,  spring 1987, pp. 25–29

H. E. Lessing: Around Michaux - myths and realities, in: Proc. of the 2nd ICHC, Saint Étienne 1991, pp. 21–29

Obituary in Kilmarnock Standard, April 9, 1904

Scottish inventors
1834 births
1904 deaths
People from Dumfries and Galloway
Sustainable_transport_pioneers